Union City may refer to:

Places in the United States

Union City, California
Union City, Connecticut
Union City, Georgia
Union City, Indiana 
Union City Commercial Historic District
Union City, Michigan
Union City, Montana, a ghost town
Union City, New Jersey
Union City, Ohio 
Union City, Oklahoma
Union City, Pennsylvania
Union City Historic District
Union City, Tennessee

Other
Union City (film), a 1980 American film
Union City, a fictional town in the video game Urban Chaos
Union City Recordings, a record label
, a cargo ship launched in 1909 as SS Iserlohn

See also